Puka Hirka (Quechua puka red, hirka mountain, "red mountain", also spelled Pucajirca) is a mountain in the Andes of Peru which reaches a height of approximately . It is located in the Huánuco Region, Dos de Mayo Province, Marías District. Puka Hirka lies northeast of Saqra Waqra.

References

Mountains of Peru
Mountains of Huánuco Region